The 2012 Gent–Wevelgem was the 74th running of the Gent–Wevelgem single-day cycling race.

In a mass sprint finish, the race was won by  rider Tom Boonen, who in the process, became the fifth different rider to win the race three times. Boonen finished ahead of 's Peter Sagan and 's Matti Breschel, who completed the podium.

Teams 
As Gent–Wevelgem was a UCI World Tour event, all 18 UCI ProTeams were invited automatically and obligated to send a squad. Seven other squads were given wildcard places into the race, and as such, formed the event's 25-team peloton. Each team could enter up to eight riders, with the starting peloton being 195 riders.

The 25 teams that competed in the race were:

Results

Women's race

References

External links

Gent–Wevelgem
Gent-Wevelgem, 2012
Gent-Wevelgem